The Frozen Limits is a 1939 British comedy western film directed by Marcel Varnel and starring Jimmy Nervo, Bud Flanagan, Teddy Knox, Chesney Allen and Charlie Naughton a group of entertainers commonly known as The Crazy Gang. It was written by Val Guest.

Produced by Gainsborough Pictures it was shot at Islington Studios in London. The film's sets were designed by the art director Alex Vetchinsky.

Plot summary

A group of British pioneers decide to take part in the 1898 Alaska and Yukon goldrush having read about it in the newspaper which wrapped up their fish and chips. Their main problem is that it is now 1939.

Cast
Jimmy Nervo as Cecil
Bud Flanagan as Bud
Teddy Knox as Teddy
Chesney Allen as Ches
Charlie Naughton as Charlie
Jimmy Gold as Jimmy
Moore Marriott as Tom Tiddler
Eileen Bell as Jill
Anthony Hulme as Tex O'Brien
Bernard Lee as Bill McGrew
Eric Clavering as Foxy

References

Bibliography
 Mayer, Geoff. Guide to British Cinema. Greenwood Publishing Group, 2003.

External links

1939 films
1930s English-language films
British Western (genre) comedy films
1930s Western (genre) comedy films
British black-and-white films
Films directed by Marcel Varnel
Films with screenplays by Marriott Edgar
1939 comedy films
Gainsborough Pictures films
Islington Studios films
1930s British films